Year 1427 (MCDXXVII) was a common year starting on Wednesday (link will display the full calendar) of the Julian calendar.

Events 
 January–December 
 January – Spring – Radu II of Wallachia resumes the throne for the fourth time, but a seven-year struggle for it ends when he is defeated in battle, and probably killed, by Dan II, who resumes the throne for a fifth term.
 April – The House of Balsic's rule of Montenegro comes to an end with the death of Balša III.
 August 4 – Hussite Wars – Battle of Tachov: The Hussites decisively beat the crusader armies, ending the Fourth Anti-Hussite Crusade.
 August 17 – The first band of Gypsies visits Paris, according to an account of the citizens of Paris.
 October 13 – Lincoln College, a constituent college of the University of Oxford in England, is founded by the Bishop of Lincoln.

 Date unknown 
 Gabriel V is elected Patriarch of the Coptic Church for the second time.
 Minrekyansa becomes King of Ava (ancient Burma).
 The Conflict of Druimnacour occurs in Sutherland, Scotland.
 The first witch hunts begin, in Switzerland.
 The Celestine Order is established in France.
 The Celebration of Sant Jordi (Saint George) begins in Catalonia (he will later become its patron saint).
 Bremen is expelled from the Hanseatic League.
 Diogo de Silves, Portuguese navigator, discovers seven islands of the Azores archipelago.
 Battle of the Echinades: A Byzantine fleet defeats the fleet of Carlo I Tocco.
 Itzcoatl becomes the 4th Tlatoani of Tenochtitlan, after his nephew Chimalpopoca is killed by the Maxtla, at Azcapotzalco.
 Bhaktapur Royal Palace (in Nepal) is built by King Yaksa Malla.

Births 
 February 27 – Ruprecht, Archbishop of Cologne (d. 1480)
 May 8 – John Tiptoft, 1st Earl of Worcester, Lord High Treasurer (d. 1470)
 May 29 – Françoise d'Amboise, duchess consort of Brittany, co-founder of the first monastery of the Carmelites in France (d. 1485)
 June 22 – Lucrezia Tornabuoni, Italian writer, adviser and spouse of Piero di Cosimo de' Medici (d. 1482)
 September 9 – Thomas de Ros, 9th Baron de Ros, English politician (d. 1464)
 October 26 – Archduke Sigismund of Austria (d. 1496)
 November 24 – John Stafford, 1st Earl of Wiltshire (d. 1473)
 November 29 – Zhengtong Emperor of China (d. 1464)
 November 30 – Casimir IV Jagiellon, King of Poland (d. 1492)
 date unknown – Shen Zhou, Chinese painter (d. 1509)

Deaths 
 April 17 – John IV, Duke of Brabant (b. 1403)
 May 7 – Thomas la Warr, 5th Baron De La Warr, English churchman
 May 28 – Henry IV, Count of Holstein-Rendsburg (b. 1397)
 July 19 – Stefan Lazarević, Despot of Serbia (b. 1377)
 date unknown
 Chimalpopoca, Aztec Tlatoani (ruler) of Tenochtitlán (b. 1397)
 Qu You, Chinese novelist (b. 1341)
 probable
 Jehuda Cresques, Catalan cartographer (b. 1350)
 Gentile da Fabriano, Italian painter
 Radu II Prasnaglava, ruler of Wallachia, probably killed in or after a lost battle

References